Severe Tropical Cyclone Evan was considered to be the worst tropical cyclone to affect the island nation of Samoa since Cyclone Val in 1991 and was formerly the strongest storm to impact the main islands until Winston in 2016. Over the next couple of days the depression gradually developed further before it was named Evan on December 12, as it had developed into a tropical cyclone.

The storm moved east and impacted the French islands of Wallis and Futuna before affecting Samoa and American Samoa. On December 16 Evan turned to the south and paralleled western areas of Fiji.

Meteorological history

Over the next couple of days, the system gradually developed further, as it was steered eastwards by an upper-level ridge of high pressure. During December 11, as the system passed near the island of Futuna, the United States Joint Typhoon Warning Center (JTWC) initiated warnings on the system and designated it as Tropical Cyclone 04P, after it had become equivalent to a tropical storm. During that day the precipitation radar on NASA's Tropical Rainfall Measuring Mission observed a complete eyewall surrounding the system's eye, which NASA speculated could mean that Evan was stronger than originally thought. The FMS subsequently named the system Evan during December 12, after it had become a Category 1 tropical cyclone on the Australian tropical cyclone intensity scale.

After the system was named, the upper-level ridge continued to steer Evan eastward, toward the Samoan islands, as the cyclone quickly intensified. The JTWC also reported that day that the system had become equivalent to a category 1 hurricane on the Saffir-Simpson hurricane scale (SSHS) with 1-minute sustained wind speeds of 120 km/h (75 mph). Over the next 12 hours, the system developed a  cloud-filled eye on visible imagery, while the system's forward motion started to slow down as it entered a weak steering environment with the upper-level ridge of high pressure to the north of the system weakened and a subtropical ridge of high pressure developed to the south of the system.

Early on December 17 the JTWC reported that Cyclone Evan had reached its peak intensity with 1-minute windspeeds of 230 km/h (145 mph), which made it equivalent to a category 4 hurricane on the SSHS. During that day Evan started to gradually weaken as it moved around the coast of the Fijian island of Viti Levu. With RSMC Nadi reporting by 1800 UTC (0700 UTC+13, December 18) that the system had weakened into a category 3 severe tropical cyclone.

Evan had also moved into cooler sea surface temperatures, below 27 °C (81 °C), so evaporation and thunderstorm development had waned, leading to falling cloud heights because of less moisture.

On December 19, RSMC Nadi reported that Cyclone Evan had weakened below cyclone intensity and declassified it as a tropical cyclone, before the JTWC issued their final warning later that day as the system started to transition into an extratropical cyclone. Over the next couple of days the remnant low continued moving southwards and moved below 25°S and into the Wellington tropical cyclone warning centre's (TCWC Wellington) area of responsibility. During December 21, the system started to move towards the southwest as it directed a moist tropical airmass onto the North Island during the next day. The remnants of Evan were last noted by TCWC Wellington during December 25.

Preparations and impact
As a result of its impact on the island nations, the name Evan was subsequently retired, from the list of names for the region by the World Meteorological Organization.

Fiji

During December 10, the FMS issued heavy rain warnings for parts of Fiji, as the trough of low pressure associated with the system, was bringing heavy rain and squally thunderstorms to parts of Fiji which they warned could lead to flash floods in parts of the archipelago. These warnings were subsequently cancelled during the next day as the system moved away from Fiji, however they started to note that the global numerical weather guidance products were agreeing on the depression, re-curving as a tropical cyclone and to start directly impacting Fiji from December 16. During the next three days, the FMS issued calls for communities to be prepared, heed warnings and act responsibly, so that they could avoid "unnecessary loss of lives and properties", as Cyclone Evan was expected to be at least a Category 4 Severe Tropical Cyclone when it entered Fijian waters. Between December 15 - 18 as the system approached and passed through the archipelago, the FMS issued various strong, gale, storm and hurricane-force wind warnings for Fiji.

Ahead of the system approaching and impacting the island nation, people were evacuated to emergency shelters. Fiji Airways (Air Pacific) announced they are suspending all flights to Savusavu, as well as the international flights from Nadi to Auckland and Brisbane on December 16.

Upon passing over Fiji, over 8,000 people were living in shelters, including many tourists. Although there were no initial reports of casualties, the storm brought considerable damage. Trees and power lines were down across the island group. In addition, flooding and structural damage was reported from resorts and homes.

Damage throughout Fiji amounted to FJ$169.9 million (US$108.8 million). Additionally, short-term economic losses related to the cyclone were estimated reach FJ$73.4 million (US$40.9 million).

Wallis and Futuna

Ahead of the system affecting the French Territory for the second time, various warning alerts were issued for the two islands, with people were urged to prepare. The cyclone passed through the French territory without any reported casualties, and while Futuna Island was spared any major damage, extensive damage was reported on Wallis Island.

Samoa

Cyclone Evan affected the independent state of Samoa between December 11 and 15, and was considered to be the worst tropical cyclone to affect Samoa, since Cyclone Val in 1991. After the system was named on December 12, the Samoan Deputy and Acting Prime Minister Fonotoe Pierre Lauofo, signed a Disaster Declaration which lasted for 48 hours and activated all disaster response provisions of the Samoan National Disaster Management Plan. During that day the Samoa Meteorology Division issued gale and storm force wind warnings and a hurricane watch for Samoa, while preparations for the system started with several people boarding up their homes.

The cyclone struck, causing widespread damage in the capital, Apia. Many of the roads were blocked by flood waters and downed banana trees. Evan also caused damage to Faleolo International Airport in Apia, where the departures lounge collapsed, forcing its temporary closure. As a result, Fiji Airways (Air Pacific) cancelled all flights to Apia for December 14 and 15, citing safety concerns. The storm destroyed houses and caused almost complete failures in the power and water supply systems. The Disaster Management Office reported that the Tanugamanono power plant was heavily damaged and power might not be restored for up to two months in some areas. A water treatment plant near Apia was also reported destroyed. At least three deaths were reported after the storm, including two children who were in low-lying areas and drowned. Authorities expressed concern over about the fate of at least 7 people who are still missing, as well as up to 3,000 others now living in emergency shelters.

The US Ambassador to New Zealand and Samoa David Huebner confirmed the United States had provided NZ$60,000 to the Samoan Red Cross for relief operations. New Zealand authorities said they were also ready to provide financial aid, if the local government requests it. On December 15 they did provide NZ$50,000, as well as a P-3 Orion plane to search for eight missing fishermen. Two days later the New Zealand Foreign Affairs Minister Murray McCully announced an additional NZ$550,000 was to be made available to the Samoan government, as well as the Samoan Red Cross and any agencies on the ground that might need it. Five additional New Zealand Red Cross workers were also sent to support local efforts. The Samoan Parliament opened with a somber prayer session, as the legislators prepared to receive initial assessments of the economic damage wrecked by Evan. According to reports, the bill is expected to be at least NZ$200,000,000, and possibly rise as high as 300 million.

On December 17 Samoan authorities confirmed that the death toll reached 14, after rescuers abandoned the search for 10 missing sailors. In all, damage from the storm amounted to WS$465 million (US$204 million).

American Samoa

The Pago Pago National Weather Service Forecast Office issued a gale watch for all of American Samoa a day before the storm impacted the island. As Evan intensified and moved closer to the archipelago, hurricane warnings and flash flood watches were issued for Tutuila, Aunuu, Manua and Swains Island. On December 14 authorities announced that there had been no major damage or injuries after the passage of the storm.

Tonga
During December 13, a tropical cyclone alert was issued a tropical cyclone alert for the Tongan islands of Niuatoputapu and Niuafo'ou, as it was possible that the system could produce gale-force winds over the islands within 48 hours. However these alerts were cancelled during December 14, as Evan was no longer predicted to pass close enough to the islands to produce gale-force winds or any damage on either island.

New Zealand
On December 24, the threat of heavy rain, surface flooding, swells and strong to gale-force winds continued while a swimmer drowned in rough seas of Whiritoa beach. During that day heavy rain and the threat of flooding gradually eased, before the remnants were last noted during the next day.

See also

 Cyclone Ofa
 Cyclone Val
 Cyclone Daman
 Cyclone Kina
 Cyclone Raja

Notes

References

External links

2012–13 South Pacific cyclone season
Category 4 South Pacific cyclones
Tropical cyclones in Fiji
Tropical cyclones in American Samoa
Tropical cyclones in Samoa
Tropical cyclones in Tonga
Tropical cyclones in Wallis and Futuna
2012 in American Samoa
2012 in Samoa
2012 in Tonga
2012 in Fiji
2012 in Wallis and Futuna
Retired South Pacific cyclones
Evan